Precotto is a station on Line 1 of the Milan Metro in Milan, Italy. It was opened on 1 November 1964 as part of the inaugural section of the Metro, between Sesto Marelli and Lotto.

The station is located on Viale Monza, which is in the municipality of Milan. It serves the ward of Precotto. This is an underground station with two tracks in a single tunnel. A bus to the University of Milano Bicocca serves this station.

References

Line 1 (Milan Metro) stations
Railway stations opened in 1964
1964 establishments in Italy
Railway stations in Italy opened in the 20th century